Mimoza Hafizi (born 1962) is an Albanian politician is a physicist who is a former member of the Assembly of the Republic of Albania for the LIBRA Party. She has been representing the Socialist Party from 2013 until 2016. In October 2016, together with Ben Blushi, she created LIBRA. She failed to win a second mandate on the 2017 election.

She was born on 20 February 1962 in Shkodër. She graduated from the University of Tirana in Physics and is a well known astrophysicist in the country. She later continued her doctoral studies in France, in the École Normale Supérieure in Paris.
She is a prominent figure, a well known academic and an MP since 2013 for the Shkodër County.

Education
 Doctorate in Theoretical Physics from the Paris 7 University, France (1995)
 Masters of Theoretical Physics from the Paris 7 University, France (1991)
 Graduate of Advanced Physics from the University of Tirana, Faculty of Natural Sciences (1875)
 Associated professor of Physics (2000)

References

Living people
1962 births
People from Shkodër
Albanian physicists
University of Tirana alumni
Members of the Parliament of Albania
Women members of the Parliament of Albania
20th-century Albanian scientists
21st-century Albanian scientists
20th-century Albanian politicians
21st-century Albanian politicians
21st-century Albanian women politicians